Sut Jhally (b. 1955) is a professor of communication at the University of Massachusetts Amherst, whose work focuses on cultural studies, advertising, media, and consumption. He is the producer of over 40 documentaries on media literacy topics and the founder and executive director of the Media Education Foundation.

The Media Education Foundation (MEF) is a non-profit established in 1992 which "produces and distributes documentary films and other educational resources to inspire critical reflection on the social, political, and cultural impact of American mass media." Their aim is to inspire students to think critically and in new ways about the hyper-mediated world around them.

Also the author of 6 books and numerous scholarly and popular articles, Jhally is a public speaker and teacher. He has won the "Distinguished Communist Award" at the University of Massachusetts, Amherst, where the student newspaper has also voted him "Best Professor." He has shown his films and lectured at many colleges and universities nationally and internationally. He was named one of New Woman magazine's "People of the Year" in 1992. Jhally taught both undergraduate and graduate level courses which focused on media, public relations and propaganda, as well as gender, sex and representation.

Jhally, in a speech from 2010 on the threat of advertising, states that "advertising is the most powerful and sustained system of propaganda in human history and its cumulative cultural and political effects unless very quickly checked will be responsible for destroying the world as we know it. In the process of achieving this the masters of the advertising system, global corporations bent on nothing but private profits, will be responsible for the deaths of millions of people, mostly non-Western. In addition the peoples of the world will be prevented from achieving true happiness. Simply stated our survival as a species is dependent upon minimizing the threat from advertising and the commercial culture that has spawned it."

Jhally was born in Kenya, and raised in England. After completing his undergraduate work at the University of York in England, he moved to Canada after accepting a scholarship to the University of Victoria. He continued his studies at Simon Fraser University, where he received his PhD.

Works 
Jhally is often highly critical of popular culture, advertising, as well as various aspects of US foreign policy. 

In his 1991 video Dreamworlds he describes the image of women in music videos as male adolescent fantasies: young and pretty, willing and eager to please men, saying no when meaning yes, often reduced to outward appearances and body parts. He concludes that an unhealthy attitude towards sexual violence can be fostered by these videos, and calls for balancing them with other cultural representations of sexuality. When MTV complained about his use of parts of copyrighted music videos, he claimed fair use and contacted the media about the story.

In the 2004 video Peace, Propaganda & the Promised Land he attempts to establish the influence of Israeli propaganda and PR on the United States public opinion regarding the Israeli–Palestinian conflict.

In the 2004 video Hijacking Catastrophe he argues that the "War on Terror" has been used by U.S. officials as a pretext to project military power across the world.

In his 2006 video Reel Bad Arabs he explores the vilification of Arabs in American cinema, following Jack Shaheen's 2001 book Reel Bad Arabs.

Criticism 
Laurie Meeker of Evergreen State College criticized Sut's Dreamworlds for "failing to draw attention to his own manipulations of the medium" of rock video.

Video documentaries 
 Pack of Lies – the Advertising of Tobacco (with Jean Kilbourne) (1992)
 The Killing Screens (with George Gerbner) (1994)
 The Date Rape Backlash (1994)
 Slim Hopes (with Jean Kilbourne) (1995)
 Dreamworlds II: Desire, Sex, Power in Music Video (1997)
 Advertising and the End of the World (1998)
 Off the Straight and Narrow (with Katherine Sender) (1998)
 Tough Guise: Men, Violence and the Crisis in Masculinity (with Jackson Katz) (1999)
 Killing Us Softly 3 (with Jean Kilbourne) (1999)
 Wrestling with Manhood: Boys, Bullying & Battering (with Jackson Katz) (2002)
 No Logo (2003), based on Naomi Klein's book No Logo
 Playing UnFair, The Media Image of the Female Athlete (2003)
 Hijacking Catastrophe: 9/11, Fear & the Selling of American Empire (with Jeremy Earp), (2004)
 Peace, Propaganda & the Promised Land (with Bathsheba Ratzkoff), (2004)
 Reel Bad Arabs: How Hollywood Vilifies a People (2006), based on Jack Shaheen's 2001 book Reel Bad Arabs
 Dreamworlds 3: Desire, Sex & Power in Music Video (2007)
 The Codes of Gender (2010)
 The Occupation of the American Mind: Israel's Public Relations War in the United States (2016)
 Advertising at the Edge of the Apocalypse (2017)

Books 
 Cultural Politics in Contemporary America, edited by Ian H. Angus and Sut Jhally (Routledge, 1988), 
 Enlightened Racism (with Justin Lewis), (1992), . Argues that The Cosby Show reinforced the myth that Blacks who don't "make it" have only themselves to blame.
 The Codes of Advertising (1999), 
 Social Communication in Advertising (with William Leiss, Stephen Kline, and Jacqueline Botterill), (2004), 
 The Spectacle of Accumulation : essays in culture, media, & politics, (2006),

Articles 
 "Advertising at the Edge of the Apocalypse", in: Robin Andersen and Lance Strate (eds), Critical studies in media commercialism, New York, 2000

References

External links 

 
 Sut Jhally's page at U. Mass. Amherst
 NYT Filmography
 
 Sut Jhally v. James Twitchell: [https://web.archive.org/web/20010306045842/http://stayfreemagazine.org/archives/16/twitchell.html What's wrong with advertising? (a debate)], Stay Free magazine #16, Summer 1999

American socialists
American people of Indian descent
American businesspeople
Living people
University of Massachusetts Amherst faculty
Simon Fraser University alumni
English people of Indian descent
American male writers of Indian descent
British emigrants to the United States
1955 births
Alumni of the University of York
Kenyan people of Asian descent
Massachusetts socialists